Erythrodiplax funerea, the black-winged dragonlet, is a species of skimmer in the dragonfly family Libellulidae. It is found in Central America, North America, and South America.

The IUCN conservation status of Erythrodiplax funerea is "LC", least concern, with no immediate threat to the species' survival. The IUCN status was assessed in 2016.

References

External links

 

Libellulidae
Insects described in 1861